Ko Cheng, or La Khai, was a king of Champa from 1390–1400. This general of Che Bong Nga's led the retreat back to Champa in 1390, following the death of Che Bong Nga by a musketry salvo.  Back in Champa, he declared himself king, usurping the two sons of Che Bong Nga, Che Ma-no Da-nan and Che San-no.

During his reign, he abandoned most of the territory won by his predecessor, Che Bong Nga.

References

Kings of Champa
Hindu monarchs
14th-century Vietnamese monarchs
1400 deaths
Vietnamese monarchs